The optative mood ( or ; abbreviated ) is a grammatical mood that indicates a wish or hope regarding a given action. It is a superset of the cohortative mood and is closely related to the subjunctive mood but is distinct from the desiderative mood.
English has no morphological optative, but various constructions impute an optative meaning. Examples of languages with a morphological optative mood are Ancient Greek, Albanian, Armenian, Georgian, Friulian, Kazakh, Kurdish, Navajo, Old Prussian, Old Persian, Sanskrit, Turkish, and Yup'ik.

English

Although English has no morphological optative, analogous constructions impute an optative meaning, including the use of certain modal verbs:
May you have a long life! 
Would that I were younger. 
Periphrastic constructions include if only together with a subjunctive complement:
If only I were rich!
I would sing if only I weren't tone deaf.
The optative mood can also be expressed elliptically:
(May) God save the Queen! 
(May you) Have a nice day.
(May) God bless America. 
The cohortative verb phrases let's (or let us) represent a syntactical mood as a subset of the optative mood:
Let's try it. 
Let us pray.

Indo-European languages

Proto-Indo-European
The optative is one of the four original moods of Proto-Indo-European (the other three being the indicative mood, the subjunctive mood, and the imperative mood).  However, many Indo-European languages lost the inherited optative, either as a formal category, or functional, i.e. merged it with the subjunctive, or even replaced the subjunctive with optative.

Albanian
In Albanian, the optative (lit. "wishing mood") expresses wishes, and is also used in curses and swearing. 
 Wish:  (May you reach/live 100 years)
 Curse:  (May the devil take you)

Ancient Greek

In Ancient Greek, the optative is used to express wishes and potentiality in independent clauses (but also has other functions, such as contrary-to-fact expressions in the present). In dependent clauses (purpose, temporal, conditional, and indirect speech), the optative is often used under past-tense main verbs. The optative expressing a wish is on its own or preceded by the particle εἴθε. The optative expressing potentiality is always accompanied by the untranslatable particle ἄν in an independent clause and is on its own in a dependent clause.

In Koine Greek, the optative began to be replaced by the subjunctive; in the New Testament, it was primarily used in set phrases.

Germanic languages
Some Germanic verb forms often known as subjunctives are actually descendants of the Proto-Indo-European optative. The Gothic present subjunctive nimai "may he take!" may be compared to Ancient Greek present optative  "may he bear!"  That the old Indo-European optative is represented by the subjunctive is clear in Gothic, which lost the old, "true" Indo-European subjunctive that represented a fixed desire and intent. Its function was adopted by the present form of the optative that reflected only possibilities, unreal things and general wishes at first.

A Germanic innovation of form and functionality was the past tense of the optative, which reflected the irrealis of past and future. This is shown by evidence in the Gothic language, Old High German, Old English, and Old Norse. This use of the (new) optative past tense as an irrealis mood started apparently after the Proto-Germanic past tense that had been once the perfect tense supplanted the Indo-German aorist (compare Euler 2009:184).

A somewhat archaic Dutch saying, 'Leve de Koning' ("long live the king") is another example of how the optative still is present in Germanic languages today.

Latin
Likewise in Latin, the newer subjunctive is based on the Indo-European optative. With this change in Latin, several old subjunctive forms became future forms. Accordingly, the prohibitive (negative desire and prohibition) was formed with the combination of *ne + verb form in the optative present.

Romanian
In Romanian, the conditional and optative moods have identical forms, thus being commonly referred to as the optative-conditional mood.

Sanskrit
In Sanskrit, the optative is formed by adding the secondary endings to the verb stem. It sometimes expresses wishes, requests and commands: bhares "may you bear" (active voice) and bharethās "may you bear [for yourself]" (middle). It also expresses possibilities (e.g. kadācid goṣabdena budhyeta "he might perhaps wake up due to the bellowing of cows") or doubt and uncertainty (e.g., katham vidyām Nalam "how would I be able to recognize Nala?"). The optative is sometimes used instead of a conditional mood.

Basque
Zuberoan dialect has a special mood, called Botiboa (Votive), and unknown to the other dialects, used for making wishes. The auxiliary verb, whose characteristic is the prefix ai-, always precedes the main verb and, in negative wishes, also the negative adverb ez (meaning no, not):

 Ailü ikusi! ('If she/he had only seen it/him/her!').
 Ailü ez ikusi! ('If he/she hadn't only seen her/him/it!').

In Standard Basque, like in all the other dialects, such wishes are made with the particle ahal, and the future indicative tense:

 Arazoa ikusiko ahal du! ('I wish he/she saw the problem').
 Ez ahal du ikusiko! ('I hope she/he will not see her/him/it'): in negative wishes, the particle ahal goes between the negative adverb ez and the verbal auxiliary.

All the dialects have verbal forms in the imperative mood (Agintera), even for commands concerning the 3rd person, both singular and plural:

 Liburua ikus beza! ('May he/she see the book!').  
 Liburuak ikus bitzate! ('May they see the books!').

For commands concerning the 1st person, present subjunctive forms are used:

 Liburua ikus dezadan! ('Let me see the book! —it is not asking any listener for permission to see that book, but a personal wish').
 Liburuak ikus ditzagun! ('Let's see the books!').

Finnish
In Finnish, the optative or the second imperative, is archaic, mainly appearing in poetry, and used in suppletion with the first imperative. It is formed using the suffixes -ko- and -kö-, depending on vowel harmony, whereas the first imperative uses the suffixes -ka- and -kä-, both cases subjected to consonant gradation; for instance, kävellös (thou shalt walk) is the active voice second person singular in present optative of the verb kävellä (to walk), and ällös kävele is the negative (don’t walk). (The corresponding first imperative forms are kävele and älä kävele.)

Altogether there can be constructed 28 verb inflections in the optative, complete with active and passive voice, present and perfect, three person forms both in singular and plural and a formal plural form. Most, if not all, of these forms are, however, utterly rare and are not familiar to non-professionals. Only some expressions have remained in day-to-day speech; for instance, one can be heard to say ollos hyvä instead of ole hyvä ("you're welcome" or "here you go"). This form carries an exaggerated, jocular connotation.

Optative formality can be expressed with the 1st and the 2nd imperative. For example, the ninth Article of the Universal Declaration of Human Rights begins with Älköön ketään pidätettäkö mielivaltaisesti, "Not anyone shall be arrested arbitrarily", where älköön pidätettäkö "shall not be arrested" is the imperative of ei pidätetä "is not arrested". (Also, using the conditional mood -isi- in conjunction with the clitic -pa yields an optative meaning, e.g. olisinpa "if I only were". Here, it is evident that the wish is not, and probably will not be, fulfilled.)

Japanese
The Japanese optative is formed by using a conditional such as ba (-ば) or tara (-たら). For example, "I wish there were more time" is expressed literally as "If there were time, it would be good." (時間があれば良いのに Jikan ga areba ii noni.), where aru, the verb expressing existence, is in the ba conditional form areba.  Ii is the present tense of "good," but if expressed in the past tense yokatta よかった, the sentence expresses regret instead of a wish or hope. The above example would become "If there had been time, it would have been good" 時間があればよかったのに, as might be said of an opportunity missed because of a lack of time.

The optative mood can also be expressed by suffixing 様に yō ni to the verb, typically the polite form. For instance, "may you have a pleasant trip" 楽しい旅になります様に.

Mongolian
The Mongolian optative or "wishing form" (Хүсэх Хэлбэр) is used largely to "tell another person about a wish not connected to the listener". Colloquially, however, it can also be used for a wishful second person imperative. It is formed by joining the suffix -аасай/-ээсэй/-оосой to the root stem of the verb. e.g.
Үзэх= to see. үз—ээсэй.

It can also be used to form wishes in the past tense.

Sumerian 
In Sumerian, the optative of the 1st person is formed differently from the other persons:

Thereby, take note that the "normal" indicator of the 1st person in the cohortative (would be a suffix -en) is mostly omitted, as with the cohortative prefix, the 1st person is already expressed. In the case of the precative, the personal indicator has to be used to differentiate between the 2nd and 3rd person.

Turkish
The optative in Turkish is part of the wish mood (dilek kipi) which reflects the command, desire, necessity, or wish. It has several semantic nuances. For instance, the word for "to come" (infinitive: gelmek) is modified in the optative to geleyim. This creates also a one-word sentence and means according to the context 
I may come.
I come (sometime).
I want to come (sometime).
I should (sometime) come.

Desire mood 
Takes the -a or -e suffix.
geleyim, kalasınız
 may [I] come, may [you] stay

Wish-conditional mood 
It takes the -sa or -se suffix. The following example reflect a wish:
gelse, kalsanız
if [he/she/it] would come, if [you] would stay

See also
 Permissive mood

References

Grammatical moods